Honeysuckle Media, Inc. is an American media company based in New York that publishes print and digital content. Its chief verticals are racial politics and social justice, gender and sexuality, culture, and cannabis. Honeysuckle is known for reportage on controversial subjects and personal testimony.

History
Honeysuckle was founded in 2013 by filmmaker, journalist and publisher Ronit Pinto. Then based in Detroit, the publication was digital-only and centered on provocative arts, culture, and film. After the relocation of its headquarters to New York, Honeysuckle began publishing print editions in 2015, the first featuring a Detroit punk artist. Subsequent print and digital platform expansion led to national and international distribution by 2018. At the same time, the brand garnered attention for its coverage of the legal cannabis industry and legalization movements.

In 2021, Green Market Report named Honeysuckle among the top Cannabis Print Publications.

Notable features have included Spike Lee, Leonardo DiCaprio, Alan Cumming, Kirsten Dunst, Holly Hunter, Laganja Estranja, Congressman John Lewis, and veteran cannabis advocates Steve and Andrew DeAngelo, as well as the last interview of adult film performer Candida Royalle.

Social justice
Honeysuckle regularly publishes first-person accounts from marginalized communities and incarcerated or formerly incarcerated citizens. Several stories, many in partnership with prisoners’ rights activist Shawanna Vaughn, founder of the nonprofit Silent Cry Inc., have helped raise awareness of inhumane conditions in the American criminal justice system.

In 2020, Honeysuckle published an article on the case of California inmate DaReta Gail Steverson, who suffered from leukemia and COVID-19 and was deemed ineligible for parole despite her need of medical treatment. Public response to the Honeysuckle article generated a petition for Steverson’s release, ultimately garnering over 80,000 signatures. Steverson was given compassionate release from prison in November 2020.

A 2021 article on racial bias in the case of Matthew Baker, a 23-year-old Georgia man facing the death penalty for a quadruple homicide known as the “Bonfire Killings,” pointed to the lack of evidence tying Baker to the murders. In response to the story, local politicians and activists began campaigning for Baker’s release. As of July 2021, the investigation into the murders is still ongoing.

In May 2021, the Washington State Department of Corrections banned a copy of Honeysuckle’s 420 print edition from being delivered to inmate Phillip Alvin Jones, on the grounds that the magazine’s cannabis content violated the institution’s mail policy. Further investigation into the case led to a debate in other media outlets regarding censorship in prisons. Currently the Washington State Department of Corrections maintains its policy on banning cannabis publications.

Cannabis
Honeysuckle has spearheaded numerous initiatives to educate mainstream culture about the cannabis and hemp industries. The company launched the first campaign to display cannabis brands on Times Square billboards for the first time in history on December 31, 2018. Fifteen partner brands were featured, including Dasheeda Dawson of The WeedHead™, the first African American owner of a cannabis company to be showcased in that space. In 2021, in partnership with rapper Lil Wayne’s cannabis brand GKUA, Honeysuckle highlighted six women-owned companies on Times Square’s Thomson Reuters board. Featuring all-female and BIPOC brands and honoring the 50th anniversary of National Cannabis Day, the campaign included Idaho-based Tribal Hemp & Cannabis Magazine from the Indigenous Cannabis Coalition and Ontario-based Legacy 420, a First Nations retailer. This was the first Indigenous cannabis collaboration in Times Square history.

Awards
 New York State Assembly Citation Award (2019)
 New York State Senate Certificate of Recognition (2019)
 GlobalGiving Grant (The Red Backpack Fund, made possible by the Spanx by Sara Blakely Foundation) (2020)
 Global Good Foundation nomination (2021)
 IndustryWired, Top 10 Most Successful Women Leaders to Follow in 2021 (Ronit Pinto)
 Industry Era Women Leaders, 10 Most Successful Women Entrepreneurs in 2021 (Ronit Pinto)

References

External links

Digital media organizations
Organizations established in 2013
Cannabis culture
Online magazines published in the United States